The Nkoya (also Shinkoya) people are a Bantu people native to Zambia, living mostly in the Western and Southern provinces and the Mankoya area. 
As of 2006, they were estimated to number 146,000 people.
Besides Nkoya proper, Nkoya dialects include Mbowela (Mbwela, Mbwera, Shimbwera), Lushangi, Shasha, Lukolwe, Mashasha.

References 

SIL Ethnologue (2009), nka

External links
 Kazanga Cultural Association (youtube.com)
 J.M. Shimunika, W.M.J. van Binsbergen, Likota lya bankoya, Leiden, African Studies Centre, 1988
 

Ethnic groups in Zambia